Jonathan Holmes may refer to:

 Jonathan Holmes (journalist), British-born Australian television journalist and producer
 Jonathan Holmes (theatre director) (born 1975), British theatre director and writer
 Jonathan Holmes (basketball) (born 1992), American basketball player

See also 
 John Holmes (disambiguation)